Darkhan Assadilov (born 8 August 1987) is a Kazakhstani karateka. He won one of the bronze medals in the men's 67 kg event at the 2020 Summer Olympics held in Tokyo, Japan. In 2010, he won the gold medal in the men's kumite 60 kg event at the Asian Games held in Guangzhou, China.

He is also a two-time medalist at the World Karate Championships.

Career 

In 2009, he competed in the men's kumite 60 kg at the World Games held in Kaohsiung, Taiwan without winning a medal. He won one match, drew one match and lost one match and he did not advance to the knock-out stage.

At the Asian Games he competed in the men's kumite 60 kg event in 2014 and in that event in 2018 without winning a medal.

In 2018, he won one of the bronze medals in the men's kumite 60 kg event at the World Karate Championships held in Madrid, Spain.

In 2020, he qualified to represent Kazakhstan in karate at the 2020 Summer Olympics in Tokyo, Japan. He won one of the bronze medals in the men's 67 kg event.

He competed in the men's kumite 60 kg event at the 2022 World Games held in Birmingham, United States.

Achievements

References

External links 

 
 

1987 births
Living people
Kazakhstani male karateka
Karateka at the 2010 Asian Games
Karateka at the 2014 Asian Games
Karateka at the 2018 Asian Games
Medalists at the 2010 Asian Games
Asian Games medalists in karate
Asian Games gold medalists for Kazakhstan
Competitors at the 2009 World Games
Competitors at the 2022 World Games
Karateka at the 2020 Summer Olympics
Olympic karateka of Kazakhstan
Olympic medalists in karate
Medalists at the 2020 Summer Olympics
Olympic bronze medalists for Kazakhstan
People from Turkistan Region
21st-century Kazakhstani people